Fairplay Township is a township in Marion County, Kansas, United States.  As of the 2010 census, the township population was 107, not including the city of Florence.

Geography

Cities and towns
The township contains the following settlements:
 City of Florence (west part).  The east part of Florence is located in Doyle Township.
 Ghost town of Oursler.

Cemeteries
The township contains the following cemeteries:
 Allison Cemetery (no longer in use), located in Section 13 T21S R4E.
 St. Patrick's Catholic Cemetery (aka Mount Calvary Cemetery), located in Section 14 T21S R5E.

Transportation
U.S. Route 50 and U.S. Route 77 pass through the township.

References

Further reading

External links
 Marion County website
 City-Data.com
 Marion County maps: Current, Historic, KDOT

Townships in Marion County, Kansas
Townships in Kansas